The Adventures of Captain Horn is an 1895 adventure novel by Frank R. Stockton that was the third-best selling book in the United States in 1895.  A sequel, Mrs. Cliff's Yacht, was released in 1897.

References

External links
 The Adventures of Captain Horn full text at Project Gutenberg

1895 American novels